Penn is a biography of William Penn written for children by Elizabeth Janet Gray. Illustrated by George Gillett Whitney, it was published in 1938 and was a Newbery Honor recipient in 1939.

References

1938 children's books
Children's history books
American children's books
American biographies
Newbery Honor-winning works
Viking Press books